We, the Accused is a 1935 crime novel by the British writer Ernest Raymond. It is inspired by the Edwardian era Doctor Crippen case. The novel is written to engage the reader's sympathy for the murderous protagonists.

Synopsis
Schoolteacher Paul Presset lives with his domineering wife. When he realises there is a chance of finding happiness with a kinder woman, his thoughts turn increasingly to murder.

Adaptation
In 1980, it was made into a five-part television series of the same name, starring Ian Holm, Angela Down and Iain Cuthbertson.

References

Bibliography
Baskin, Ellen. Serials on British Television, 1950-1994. Scolar Press, 1996.
 Dalrymple, Roger. Crippen: A Crime Sensation in Memory and Modernity. Boydell & Brewer, 2020.
 Hilfer, Tony. The Crime Novel: A Deviant Genre. University of Texas Press, 2014.
Priestman, Martin . The Cambridge Companion to Crime Fiction. Cambridge University Press, 2003.

1935 British novels
Novels set in London
British crime novels
Novels by Ernest Raymond
Cassell (publisher) books
British novels adapted into television shows